Acrocercops desmochares is a moth of the family Gracillariidae, known from Brazil. It was described by Edward Meyrick in 1921.

References

desmochares
Moths of South America
Moths described in 1921